"Innamorata" is a song written in 1955. The music was written by Harry Warren and the lyrics by Jack Brooks.

Background
It was written for the 1955 Martin and Lewis film, Artists and Models and Dean Martin sang it while rubbing sun oil into Dorothy Malone's back. Shirley MacLaine reprised the song in comedy fashion.
In Italian, the word innamorata means "in love".

Chart performance
The biggest selling recording of the song was sung by Dean Martin (issued as Capitol Records catalog number 3352), reaching number 27 on the Billboard chart in 1956. Jerry Vale also had a major recording (Columbia Records catalog number 40634) of the song in the same year, which peaked at number 30.  More recently, Vale was interviewed by a YouTube user about the song, and had this to say about the way his version was recorded:

On the Cashbox magazine Best-Selling Records chart, which combined all versions of the song, it reached position number 17.

Popular culture
The song is used in the comedy film Hot Shots! Part Deux.

References

Songs with lyrics by Jack Brooks (lyricist)
Songs with music by Harry Warren
Songs written for films
1955 songs
1956 singles
Dean Martin songs
Jerry Vale songs